State Rep. Janet Yang Rohr, D-Naperville, represents the 41st District, serving the Naperville and Warrenville., Illinois communities in the Illinois House of Representatives. She began her first term in January 2021 as a part of the 102nd General Assembly.

Early life and education
Yang Rohr is a life-long resident of Naperville, Illinois. She attended Ranch View Elementary School, Kennedy Junior High School, and Naperville North High School. She earned a Bachelor of Arts  degree in English and Economics from Northwestern University and she earned her Master of Business Administration in Finance, Accounting, and Entrepreneurship at University of Chicago Booth School of Business.

Career
Yang Rohr served as a school board member for Naperville Community Unit School District 203 schools from 2017-2021. She is the head of Managed Investment Data at Morningstar, Inc. Yang Rohr holds the Chartered Financial Analyst designation and has been widely quoted for her investment expertise.

Electoral history

Committee assignments and key legislation
Yang Rohr serves on the following committees: Appropriations-General Service; Elementary and Secondary Education: School Curriculum Policies; Financial Institutions; Insurance; Personnel and Pensions; Veterans' Affairs.

During the 2021 General Session, Yang Rohr sponsored the Mental Health Early Action on Campus Act, which requires school districts and public colleges and university to provide contact information for the National Suicide Prevention Lifeline, the Crisis Text Line, and a local suicide prevention hotline on their school-issued identification cards.

Yang Rohr also sponsored the Opioid Overdose Reduction Act, which provides that a person experiencing an overdose shall not be charged or prosecuted for possession of a controlled, counterfeit, or look-alike substance or a controlled substance analog if the evidence for the possession charge was acquired as a result of the person seeking or obtaining emergency medical assistance.

Caucus memberships
Yang Rohr is a member of the Women’s Caucus and the Asian Caucus within the Illinois House of Representatives.

Personal life
She lives in Naperville, Illinois. She is married and is a mother to three children.

References

External links

21st-century American politicians
21st-century American women politicians
Asian-American state legislators in Illinois
Living people
Democratic Party members of the Illinois House of Representatives
Northwestern University alumni
University of Chicago Booth School of Business alumni
Women state legislators in Illinois
Year of birth missing (living people)